Delaware held its election October 4, 1814.

See also 
 United States House of Representatives elections, 1814 and 1815
 List of United States representatives from Delaware

Notes 

1814
Delaware
United States House of Representatives